ISU may refer to:

Schools

United States
 Idaho State University, Pocatello, Idaho
 Illinois State University, Normal, Illinois
 Illinois State University (Springfield, Illinois)
 Indiana State University, Terre Haute, Indiana
 Iowa State University, Ames, Iowa

Elsewhere
 I-Shou University, Kaohsiung, Taiwan
 Ifugao State University, in the Philippines
 Ilia State University, in Tbilisi, Georgia
 Imo State University
 Ingush State University, in Magas, Republic of Ingushetia
 International School of Uganda, Kampala, Uganda
 International School of Ulaanbaatar, Mongolia
 International Solomon University, in Ukraine
 International Space University, Illkirch-Graffenstaden, France
 Irkutsk State University, in Eastern Siberia

Organizations
 ISU (trade union), British trade union formerly known as the Immigration Service Union
 Integrated Security Unit, in Canada
 Internal Security Unit, the counter-intelligence unit of the Provisional Irish Republican Army (IRA)
 International Seamen's Union
 International Skating Union

Other
 Italian Service Units, Italian prisoner of war army units that served on the Allied side during World War II
 ISU (singer)
 Isu language (Bantu), also called Suwu or Subu, a Bantu language of Cameroon
 Isu language, a Grassfields Bantu language of Cameroon
 Isu, Nigeria, a local government area of Imo State
 Isu people, an ethnic group in Nigeria
 Isu station, on the Seoul Metropolitan Subway
 ISU-152, ISU-122, Soviet self-propelled guns
 SAP IS-U, Industry Specific Solution for Utilities
 International System of Units, the SI system
 ISU, the IATA airport code for Sulaimaniyah International Airport, Iraq